Beng Per Wildlife Sanctuary is a  large protected area in northern Cambodia that was established in 1993.

It is located south of the Northern Plains Dry Forest Priority Corridor. It hosts wild cattle and deer, large water birds and elephants, as well as important archaeological sites. This deforestation is mostly driven by rubber plantations.

References

External links 
 Map of protected areas in Cambodia

Wildlife sanctuaries of Cambodia
Protected areas of Cambodia
Protected areas established in 1993
Geography of Kampong Thom province
Geography of Preah Vihear province